Nosophora dispilalis is a moth in the family Crambidae. It was described by George Hampson in 1896. It is found on Borneo, Ambon Island and in India (Assam) and Australia.

References

Moths described in 1896
Spilomelinae
Moths of Asia
Moths of Australia